J-Melo is a weekly Japanese music television program broadcast by NHK. It is recorded entirely in the English language. It began broadcasting on October 7, 2005. The program is available on NHK's World Service television station, Radio Japan, Digital Educational TV and on its Domestic General Channel.

History and Programming 

The program started broadcasting on October 7, 2005, and was hosted by Mai Takematsu, a Japanese harpist. The name "J-Melo" comes from the words, "Japan", "Melody", and "Mellow". The show is the first Japanese music program produced by NHK to be recorded entirely in English, and presents various Japanese music and musicians to the rest of the world through its global television station, NHK World. The show is also aired in Japan in English with Japanese subtitles. In March 2007, Mai Takematsu left the show in order to pursue her medical career, and in April 2007, she was replaced by Japanese singer, melody. She hosted the show until September 2008, when it was announced that May J. will host the succeeding episodes. The new J-Melo debuted in October 2008, with May J. along with Shanti presenting the program, with an updated set and website and a new opening billboard. It was the first time that the program had two permanent presenters. Shanti, however, left the show in 2010. Aside from music videos, the program features interviews and recorded performances.

In 2009, J-Melo started a music project, a fictitious band called Rough-T with manga characters fronted by Takekawa Ai, produced by Marty Friedman, and with additional production by international independent artists kevn, Kirby and Crazy Dragon.
J-Melo features comments from Dave Spector, who hosts most episodes together with May J.

Segments 
J-Melo has a weekly theme, where most of the video content of the show revolve around. These include topics such as "Summer Favorites", "Musicians from Okinawa" or "Summer Rock Festivals". Every other month, the show also has a request special, where viewers send requests through the J-Melo website. (In a June 2007 request special, it was revealed that the most requested Japanese musical act is L'Arc-en-Ciel.) In 2007, the show introduced the segment, "Japan Dance Music Adventure," a monthly dance special, where the host tours Japan in search of traditional and modern dance music.

Specials 

Every year since 2005, the show has an annual special, counting down the top singles of the year. Since 2007, however, J-Melo aired among others, aired a summer special, several "live to the world" specials (filmed in front of a live audience, not aired live), an Okinawa special and a Tokushima special. Occasionally, the show will also broadcast guest highlights every quarter.

E-mail Special 
In December 2007, the program started to air an E-mail special. It counted down the countries where the show received the most e-mail from, as well as the year's top requested artists.

2007

2008

2009

2010

2011

2012

2013

2014

2015

2016

2017

2018

Guests 
Aside from a weekly theme, J-Melo also has a guest at least once a month. Most of the time, guest greetings are recorded on video to thank their supporters from outside Japan. There are also some episodes where the guests will sit down on set for an interview and sometimes, a performance. The theme for these shows will usually be the works of the guest musician. These appearances are rather significant, as the show is primarily recorded for foreign viewers. Interviews and messages are also subtitled in English whenever needed.

Notable Guests 
The following are notable guests who appeared in the show. Those with dates in light blue are guests who appeared on set, while those in light yellow are guests who appeared on video.

Notes and External links

Japanese music television series
English-language television shows
2005 Japanese television series debuts
NHK original programming